Antonella Clerici (born in Legnano on 6 December 1963) is an Italian television host and journalist.

Biography
She debuted in 1985 in Telereporter as a TV announcer. In 1987, she switched to Rai 2 where she presented Semaforo giallo, Oggi sport and later two popular sports programs, Dribbling and Domenica Sprint. During the same years she also presented Ristorante Italia and Segreti per voi. Later she hosted Forza Italia on Odeon TV with Fabio Fazio and Walter Zenga.

Clerici returned to Rai 2 in 1995 with another show about football, Telegoal. From 1996 to 1998, she was one of the presenters of Unomattina, a daily Rai 1 morning show, and she followed the 1998 Fifa World Cup with the depth program Occhio al mondiale, with Giorgio Tosatti and Giampiero Galeazzi.

In 1999/2000, she switched to Mediaset where she hosted Ma quanto costa?, aired by Retequattro. She also hosted the daily program Telegatti Story and the morning show A tu per tu, aired by Canale 5, along with Maria Teresa Ruta.

In 2000, she returned to RAI and began hosting La prova del cuoco, the Italian version of Ready Steady Cook. She successfully hosted until 2008, when she took a leave of absence to give birth to her first child.

During the 2000s (decade) has hosted also other programs for Rai 1, including Campioni per sempre: Galà dello Sport 2000, the Sunday show Domenica in, Adesso sposami, Il ristorante, Il treno dei desideri, Affari tuoi, Ti lascio una canzone and Tutti pazzi per la tele.

In 2005 hosted the Festival di Sanremo, Italy's best-known song contest, with Paolo Bonolis. She returned in 2010 as the festival's sole presenter.

In March 2010, she released her first CD, Antonella Clerici, featuring television themes. In September 2011, she returned as the host of her most popular program, La prova del cuoco. She has also released several cookbooks.

Films
Happily N'Ever After 2: Snow White—Another Bite @ the Apple (2009) as Snow White
Turbo (2013) as Burn
Natale col boss (2015) as Mrs. Tappabuco

Television 
 Semaforo giallo (1987)
 Oggi sport (1987–1989)
 Dribbling (1989–1995)
 Domenica Sprint (1990–1997)
 Ristorante Italia
 Segreti per voi
 Supergiganti 1994 (1994)
 Telegoal (1995)
 Mediterranea 1995 (1995)
 Circo bianco (1995–1996)
 Fantacalcio (1996)
 Unomattina (1997–1999)
 Premio Regia Televisiva (1997, 1999, 2007)
 Domenica In (1997–1998, 2001–2002)
 Occhio al mondiale (1998)
 Ma quanto costa? (1999)
 Telegatti Story (2000)
 A tu per tu (2000)
 La prova del cuoco (2000–2008, 2010–present)
 Campioni per sempre: Galà dello Sport (2000)
 Per Natale cucino io (2003)
 Adesso sposami (2003–2004)
 La prova del cuoco – cotta e mangiata (2004)
 Il ristorante (2004–2005)
 Festival di Sanremo 2005 (2005)
 Il treno dei desideri (2006–2007)
 Affari tuoi (2006)
 Ti lascio una canzone (2008–present)
 Tutti pazzi per la tele (2008–2009)
 Festival di Sanremo 2010 (2010)
 Arena di Verona 2010 (2010)

Discography

Albums
 Antonella Clerici (2010)

Books 
 Oggi cucini tu (2005)
 Oggi cucini tu 2 (2006)
 Oggi cucini tu light (2006)
 Oggi cucini tu 3 (2007)
 Aspettando te (2010)
 Le ricette di Casa Clerici (2010)

Notes

External links
 

1963 births
Living people
People from Legnano
Italian television presenters
Italian television journalists
Italian women television presenters
Italian women journalists